Mirko Carretta (born 23 November 1990) is an Italian footballer who plays for Südtirol as a midfielder.

Biography
Born in Gallipoli, the Province of Lecce, Carretta started his career at Gallipoli Calcio. Despite the club promoted to Serie B in 2009, the club faced financial difficulties and most of the players left the club. Carretta joined Serie D team Matera and scored 9 league goals, winning the Serie D cup and promotion playoffs. On 4 July 2010 he was signed by Lega Pro Prima Divisione side Andria BAT in 3-year contract. He received a call-up from Lega Pro representative team against Palestine U-23 team. in June 2011 and again in November 2011.

On August 2011 he was signed by Lega Pro Prima Divisione team Benevento via Chievo.

On 13 July 2012 he left for Barletta along with Antonio Junior Vacca.

On 6 August 2019, he signed a 2-year contract with Cosenza.

On 23 June 2021, he joined Perugia on a two-year contract.

On 21 June 2022, Carretta signed a two-year contract with Südtirol.

References

External links
 
 Football.it Profile  
 LaSerieD.com Profile  
 Andria Profile 
 

Italian footballers
A.S.D. Gallipoli Football 1909 players
F.C. Matera players
S.S. Fidelis Andria 1928 players
Benevento Calcio players
Matera Calcio players
Ternana Calcio players
U.S. Cremonese players
Cosenza Calcio players
A.C. Perugia Calcio players
F.C. Südtirol players
Serie B players
Serie C players
Serie D players
Association football midfielders
People from Gallipoli, Apulia
Footballers from Apulia
1990 births
Living people
Sportspeople from the Province of Lecce
21st-century Italian people